The 2012 Big Ten Conference men's soccer season was the 22nd season of men's varsity soccer in the conference. Penn State and Northwestern tied for first in the regular season, while Michigan State won the Big Ten Tournament. Indiana won the NCAA Tournament, winning their eighth title.

Preseason 
Northwestern and eventual national champions Indiana were picked to tie as the conference regular season champions.

Preseason poll

Teams

Stadia and locations 

 Illinois, Iowa, Minnesota, Nebraska and Purdue do not sponsor men's soccer

Personnel

Regular season

Results

Postseason

Big Ten Tournament

NCAA Tournament

Statistics

See also 

 Big Ten Conference
 2012 Big Ten Conference Men's Soccer Tournament
 2012 NCAA Division I men's soccer season
 2012 in American soccer

References 

 
2012 NCAA Division I men's soccer season
2012